Valle Verde may refer to:

Valle Verde, Quintana Roo, community in the municipality of Benito Juárez, Quintana Roo, Mexico
Valle Verde, Texas, census-designated place (CDP) in Webb County, Texas, United States

See also
Valle Verde Early College High School, high school located in El Paso, Texas